This is a list of media in Kingston, Ontario.

Radio

In addition to local outlets, radio and television stations from New York state (particularly the Watertown market) are readily available in Kingston. One such station, WLYK in Cape Vincent, New York, promotes itself as a Kingston station — and operates from studios in Kingston under a local management agreement — despite being officially licensed to an American community. The Queen's University campus station, CFRC-FM, is one of the oldest stations in the world, having been founded in 1922. This station served as a commercial outlet until the establishment of CKWS-AM (now CKWS-FM) in 1942.  Kingston's two legacy AM frequencies, 960 kHz (CKWS) and 1380 kHz (CKLC) are now dark after both stations moved to the FM band in the late 2000s.

Defunct radio stations

FM

88.1 FM - VF7138 (Kingston)

Television

1Nearest Global signal to Kingston; much of the city gets only a marginal over-the-air signal from CIII-TV-2.

The incumbent terrestrial cable provider in Kingston is Cogeco.

Defunct Analog TV Stations in Kingston
CKWS-TV - channel 11
CBLFT-TV-14 - channel 32
CICO-TV-38 - channel 38

Print
The Heritage
The Kingston Chronicle & Gazette (historic)
Kingston This Week
 Kingston Whig-Standard, Canada's oldest daily newspaper, founded in 1834
The Queen's Journal
Golden Words

Internet
The Kingston Local, became defunct in 2020 along with 10 other online news outlets.
Kingstonist

References

Kingston

Media, Kingston